This is a list of airlines currently operating in Belize.

See also
 List of airlines
 List of defunct airlines of Belize

References

Belize

Airlines
Airlines
Belize